TATA box-binding protein-associated factor RNA polymerase I subunit B is an enzyme that in humans is encoded by the TAF1B gene.

Function 

Initiation of transcription by RNA polymerase I requires the formation of a complex composed of the TATA-binding protein (TBP) and three TBP-associated factors (TAFs) specific for RNA polymerase I. This complex, known as SL1, binds to the core promoter of ribosomal RNA genes to position the polymerase properly and acts as a channel for regulatory signals. This gene encodes one of the SL1-specific TAFs.

Interactions 

TAF1B has been shown to interact with RRN3.

References

Further reading